Taylor v. Sturgell, 553 U.S. 880 (2008), was a United States Supreme Court case involving res judicata. It held that a "virtually represented" non-party cannot be bound by a judgment.

Background 
Greg Herrick was seeking to restore a vintage 1930s airplane. He filed an FOIA request for technical documents with the Federal Aviation Administration. The FAA found that the documents were trade secrets and denied his request, and the district court and the appellate court denied his appeal.

Later, Brent Taylor, a friend of Herrick with no participation in the previous case, filed an FOIA request for the same documents through the same lawyer. He was denied, and in his appeal he sought to fix certain omissions and mistakes in Herrick's briefs. The district and appellate courts held that Taylor was precluded from litigating the issue because he had been "virtually represented" in the prior case.

Opinion of the Court 
Associate Justice Ruth Bader Ginsburg wrote the opinion for a unanimous court, overturning the decision below by the D.C. Circuit.

References

External links
 

United States Supreme Court cases
2008 in United States case law
United States Supreme Court cases of the Roberts Court
United States res judicata case law